Burruss is a surname. Notable people with the surname include:

Julian Ashby Burruss (1876–1947), the first President of James Madison University
Kandi Burruss, (born 1976), American R&B singer-songwriter and record producer
Lloyd Burruss (born 1957), former American football safety

See also
Al Burruss Correctional Training Center, medium security level prison in the U.S. state of Georgia